The  is the head of the local government in Aichi Prefecture.

List of governors of Aichi Prefecture
Iseki Morimoto 1872-1873
Washino Takatsumu 1873-1875
Yasuba Yasukazu 1875-1880
Kunisada Rempei 1880-1885 (died in office)
Katsumata Minoru 1885-1889
Shirane Sen'ichi 1889-1890
Takatoshi Iwamura 1890-1892
Sadaaki Senda 1892
Yasuba Yasukazu 1892
Tokito Tanemoto 1892-1897
Egi Kazuyuki 1897-1898
Baron Mori Mamoru 1898-1902
Masaaki Nomura 1902
Ichizo Fukano 1902-1912
Kenzo Ishihara 1912-1913
Matsui Shigeru 1913-1919
Shunji Miyao 1919-1921
Hikoji Kawaguchi 1921-1923
Ōta Masahiro 1923-1924
Haruki Yamawaki 1924-1926
Saburo Shibata 1926-1927
Toyoji Obata 1927-1929
Masao Oka 1929-1931
Kosaka Masayasu 1931
Yujiro Osaki 1931-1932
Endo Ryusaku 1932-1933
Minabe Choji 1933-1934
Eitaro Shinohara 1934-1937
Tanaka Kōtarō (Home Ministry government official) 1937-1940
Kodama Kyūichi 1940-1941
Aikawa Katsuroku 1941-1942
Yukizawa Chiyoji 1942-1943
Shinji Yoshino 1943-1945
Tadayoshi Obata 1945
Sieve Yoshimi 1945
Ryuichi Fukumoto 1945-1946
Saburo Hayakawa 1946
Mikine Kuwahara 1946-1947
Hideo Aoyagi 1947-1951
Mikine Kuwahara (2nd term) 1951-1975
Yoshiaki Nakaya 1975-1983
Reiji Suzuki 1983-1999
Masaaki Kanda 1999-2011
Hideaki Ōmura 2011–present

 
Aichi Prefecture